Roman "Romek" Strzałkowski (March 20, 1943 – June 28, 1956) was a 13-year-old pupil killed during anti-communist protests in Poznań in 1956. He has become one of the best-known symbols of anti-communist resistance in Poland. Since 1981, one of Poznań's streets has been named after him.

References

External links

History of Romek's death (pl)

1943 births
1956 deaths
Polish children
1956 in Poland
Protest-related deaths

Child deaths